The name Jerahmeel (Hebrew , Yəraḥməʾēl; Greek ) appears several times in the Tanakh. It means "He will obtain mercy of God", "God pities", "May God have compassion", "May God pity", 
or "Moon from God".

Bearers of the name
There are probably three distinct persons of that name in the Tanakh. In order of their lifetimes they are:
 a son of the king, sent with others by Jehoiakim to arrest Baruch the scribe and Jeremiah the prophet, as given in Jeremiah 36:26. An old bulla with the inscription "Jerahmeel the king's son" has been found and considered authentic.

The Jerahmeelites
The Jerahmeelites were a people, presumably descended from Jerahmeel number 1 above, living in the Negev, who David, while in service with the Philistines, claimed to have attacked, but with whom he was really on friendly terms.

Cheyne developed a theory that made the Jerahmeelites into a significant part of the history of Israel, but most subsequent scholars have dismissed his ideas as fanciful.

An Archangel
In some deuterocanonical and apocryphal writings, there are references to an archangel variously called Jeremiel, Eremiel, Remiel, etc. See the article Jerahmeel (archangel).

The Chronicles of Jerahmeel
The Chronicles of Jerahmeel is a medieval document ascribed to the 12th century Jewish historian Jerahmeel ben Solomon, and is unrelated to any of the above.

References

Set index articles on Hebrew Bible people
Tribe of Judah